Kim Eun-hye may refer to:

Kim Eun-hye (politician)
Kim Eun-hye (sport shooter)